Tähtifantasia Award is an annual prize by Helsingin science fiction seura ry for the best foreign fantasy book released in Finland.

Recipients 
2015 
(winner) Terry Pratchett: FC Akateemiset (Unseen Academicals, 2009.)	Translated by Mika Kivimäki. Karisto, 2014.

Other shortlisted books:

 Kate Atkinson: Elämä elämältä (Life After Life, Schildts & Söderströms)
 Robert W. Chambers: Keltainen kuningas (The King in Yellow, Basam Books)
 Machado de Assis: Kuolematon ja muita novelleja (short story collection, Sammakko)
 Liz Williams: Kultainen lohikäärme (Precious Dragon, Like)

2014 	
(winner) Bruno Schulz: Kanelipuodit ja muita kertomuksia (The Street of Crocodiles, short story collection, 1934.) Translated from Polish by Tapani Kärkkäinen. Basam Books, 2013.

Other shortlisted books:

 Aloysius Bertrand: Yön Kaspar (Gaspard de la Nuit, Savukeidas)
 Eowyn Ivey: Lumilapsi (The Snow Child, Bazar)
 C. S. Lewis: Kasvoista kasvoihin (Till We Have Faces: A Myth Retold, Kirjapaja)
 Catherynne M. Valente: Tyttö joka purjehti Satumaan ympäri itse rakentamallaan laivalla (The Girl Who Circumnavigated Fairyland in a Ship of Her Own Making, Gummerus)

2013 
(winner) Steph Swainston : Uusi maailma (The Modern World, 2007.) Translated by Jyri Pekka Mäkelä. Like, 2012.

Other shortlisted books:

 Anders Fager: Pohjoiset kultit (Svenska kulter: Skräckberättelser, Atena Kustannus)
 Terry Pratchett: Posti kulkee (Going Postal, Karisto)
 Liz Williams: Aavekauppiaan tytär (Snake Agent, Like)
 Gene Wolfe: Kiduttajan varjo (The Shadow of the Torturer, Gummerus)

2012 	
(winner) Andrzej Sapkowski: 	Kohtalon miekka (Sword of Destiny, short story collection, 1992.) Translated from Polish by Tapani Kärkkäinen. WSOY, 2011.

Other shortlisted books:

 John Ajvide Lindqvist: Kultatukka, tähtönen (Lilla Stjärna, Gummerus) 	
 Hal Duncan: Pako helvetistä! (Escape from Hell!, Like)
 China Miéville: Toiset (The City and the City, Karisto)
 Ali Shaw: Tyttö joka muuttui lasiksi (The Girl with Glass Feet, Atena Kustannus)

2011

(winner) Andrzej Sapkowski: Viimeinen toivomus (The Last Wish, short story collection, 1990.) Translated from Polish by Tapani Kärkkäinen. WSOY, 2010.

Other shortlisted books:

 Terry Pratchett: Yövartiosto (Night Watch, Karisto)
 Patrick Rothfuss: Tuulen nimi (The Name of the Wind, Kirjava)
 Mari Strachan: Hiljaisuus soi H-mollissa (The Earth Hums In B Flat, Karisto)
 Steph Swainston: Kuolemattomien kaarti (The Year of Our War, Like)

2010

(winner) Haruki Murakami: Kafka rannalla (Kafka on the Shore, 2002.) Translated by Juhani Lindholm from English edition. Tammi, 2009.

Other shortlisted books:

 Joe Abercrombie: Ase itse (The Blade Itself, Kirjava)
 Jorge Luis Borges: Kuvitteellisten olentojen kirja (The Book of Imaginary Beings, Teos)
 Joe Hill: Bobby Conroy palaa kuolleista ja muita kertomuksia (20th Century Ghosts, Tammi) 
 Ursula K. Le Guin: Lavinia (Lavinia, WSOY)

2009

(winner) Ellen Kushner: Thomas Riiminiekka. (Thomas the Rhymer, 1990.) Translated by Johanna Vainikainen-Uusitalo. Vaskikirjat, 2008.

Other shortlisted books:

 Gregory Maguire: Noita (Wicked, Sammakko)
 Patricia A. McKillip: Basiliskin laulu (Song for the Basilisk, Karisto)
 José Saramago: Oikukas kuolema (As Intermitências da Morte, Tammi)
 Robert Silverberg: Kuningas Gilgameš (Gilgamesh the King, Vaskikirjat)

2008

(winner) Ngũgĩ wa Thiong'o: Variksen Velho. (Wizard of the Crow, 2006.) Translated by Seppo Loponen. WSOY, 2007.

Other shortlisted books:

 Lord Dunsany: Haltiamaan kuninkaantytär (The King of Elfland's Daughter, Vaskikirjat)
 Scott Lynch: Locke Lamoran valheet (The Lies of Locke Lamora, WSOY)
 Sean Stewart: Matkijalintu (Mockingbird, Karisto)
 J. R. R. Tolkien: Húrinin lasten tarina (The Children of Húrin, WSOY)

2007

(winner) Jeff VanderMeer: Pyhimysten ja mielipuolten kaupunki. (City of Saints and Madmen, 2001). Translated by Johanna Vainikainen-Uusitalo. Loki-kirjat, 2006.

Other shortlisted books:

 Jonathan Carroll: Valkoiset omenat (White Apples, Loki-kirjat)
 Jukka Halme (editor): Uuskummaa? (Kirjava, a short story collection)
 George R.R. Martin: Miekkamyrsky 2 (A Storm of Swords, part 2, Kirjava)
 Patricia A. McKillip: Unohdettu Ombria (Ombria in Shadow, Karisto)

See also
Tähtivaeltaja Award, the corresponding award for best translated science fiction book

Sources 

Fantasy awards
Awards established in 2007
Finnish literary awards
Science fiction awards
Finnish speculative fiction awards